"Candidatus Bartonella antechini" is a candidatus bacteria from the genus of Bartonella which was isolated from the mouse Antechinus flavipes.

References

 

Bartonellaceae
Bacteria described in 2011
Candidatus taxa